Vazmastan Namak Kasht Varzeh (also Romanized as Vazmastān Namaḵ Kasht Varzeh; also known as Vazmastān and Vezmestān) is a village in Zaz-e Sharqi Rural District, Zaz va Mahru District, Aligudarz County, Lorestan Province, Iran. At the 2006 census, its population was 41, in 8 families.

References 

Towns and villages in Aligudarz County